was a Sōtō priest, origami master, and abbot of Antai-ji near Kyoto, Japan.

Uchiyama was author of more than twenty books on Zen Buddhism and origami,  of which Opening the Hand of Thought: Foundations of Zen Buddhist Practice is best known.

Education and career
Uchiyama graduated from Waseda University with a master's degree in Western philosophy in 1937 and was ordained a priest in 1941 by his teacher Kōdō Sawaki. Throughout his life, Uchiyama lived with the damaging effects of tuberculosis.

Uchiyama became abbot of Antai-ji following Sawaki's death in 1965 until he retired in 1975 to Nokei-in, also near Kyoto, where he lived with his wife. Following the death of his teacher he led a forty-nine-day sesshin in memorial of his teacher. In retirement he continued his writing, the majority of which consisted of poetry.

Opening the Hand of Thought
Opening the Hand of Thought, first published in English in 1993 by Arkana Press, was edited by Jishō Cary Warner, and translated by Thomas Wright and Uchiyama's Dharma heir Shohaku Okumura. Portions of the book first appeared in a different English language translation in the author's Approach to Zen: The Reality of Zazen, Japan Publications, 1973. The book attempts a straightforward and practical description of Zen, with a emphasis on the practice of zazen, and uses comparisons of Buddhism and Christianity as a way for westerners to understand Uchiyama's approach 

His summary is:

which refers to his own formula: two practices of "vow" and "repentance", and three minds: "magnanimous mind, nurturing mind and joyful mind". He says his book covers butsudō, the effort of an individual to actualize their universal self.

Bibliography
 
 
 Uchiyama, Kosho (2008): Das Leben meistern durch Zazen. Angkor Verlag. .
 Uchiyama, Kosho; Sawaki, Kodo (2007): Die Zen-Lehre des Landstreichers Kodo. Angkor Verlag. .

References

Sources

External links
 Seven chapters from Uchiyama's book "The Zen Teaching of 'Homeless Kodo'"
 Kosho Uchiyama: "To you who are still dissatisfied with your zazen"
 Kosho Uchiyama: "To you who has decided to become a Zen monk"
 https://web.archive.org/web/20111003051939/http://www.zen.ite.pl/masters/kosho_uchiyama.html (Polish language)

Zen Buddhism writers
Soto Zen Buddhists
Zen Buddhist priests
1912 births
1998 deaths
Japanese Zen Buddhists
Origami artists
People from Tokyo
Writers from Tokyo